Kevin Fox (6 October 1917 – 6 September 1993) was a former Australian rules footballer who played with Carlton and Fitzroy in the Victorian Football League (VFL).

References

External links 

Kevin Fox's profile at Blueseum

1917 births
1993 deaths
Carlton Football Club players
Fitzroy Football Club players
Australian rules footballers from Victoria (Australia)